Charles D. Bluestone is an American physician, focusing in otitis, currently Distinguished Professor Emeritus of Otolarngology at University of Pittsburgh.

References

Year of birth missing (living people)
Living people
University of Pittsburgh faculty
American otolaryngologists
University of Pittsburgh alumni